Rhyacionia dativa is a species of moth of the family Tortricidae. It is found in China (Jilin, Jiangsu, Zhejiang, Anhui, Jiangxi, Shandong, Henan, Hubei, Guangdong, Sichuan), Taiwan, Korea, Japan and Russia.

The wingspan is 16–23 mm.

The larvae feed on Pinus massoniana and Pinus thunbergii.

References

Moths described in 1928
Eucosmini